Spida is a nickname of:

 Peter Everitt (born 1974), a former Australian rules footballer
 Donovan Mitchell (born 1996), an American basketball player

See also
 Spider (nickname)

Lists of people by nickname